Lodrino may refer to:

 Lodrino, Lombardy, Italy
 Lodrino, Switzerland